Bekkering is a surname. Notable people with the surname include:

 Annemiek Bekkering (born 1991), Dutch competitive sailor
 Daniëlle Bekkering (born 1976), Dutch marathon speed skater, short track speed skater, and cyclist
 Harold Bekkering (born 1965), Dutch professor of cognitive psychology
 Harry Bekkering (born 1944), Dutch cultural scientist, author and professor
 Henry Bekkering (born 1985), Canadian basketball player
 Pim Bekkering (1931–2014), Dutch football player
 Ross Bekkering (born 1987), Canadian-Dutch basketball player

Dutch-language surnames